KICR (102.3 FM) is a commercial radio station broadcasting a country music radio format. Licensed to Coeur d'Alene, Idaho, the station serves the Spokane metropolitan area.  It is owned by Blue Sky Broadcasting and calls itself "K102."

KICR has an effective radiated power (ERP) of 172 watts.  The transmitter is on West Apple Blossom Road in Post Falls, Idaho.

History
The station went on the air as KBIH on July 17, 1998. On October 2, 2001, the station changed its call sign to the current KICR.

References

External links

ICR
Radio stations established in 1998
1998 establishments in Idaho